R406 road  may refer to:
 R406 road (Ireland)
 R406 road (South Africa)